Stalwart Esports is an Indian professional esports organisation focused on mobile gaming. It was founded in January 2020. Stalwart Esports has teams competing in PUBG Mobile, Free Fire, Clash Royale and Brawl Stars. They became the first esports organisation to adopt cryptocurrencies in their balance sheet.

In September 2020, the team donated their slot of the PUBG Mobile Pro League (PMPL) South Asia to Pakistani Esports organisation Freestyle Esports after PUBG Mobile was banned in India.

In December 2021, Stalwart Esports became the only team from South Asia to qualify for PUBG Mobile Global Championship (PMGC) 2021 Grand Finals.

In May 2022, Stalwart Esports won the PMPL South Asia Championship S2.

PUBG Mobile 
In August 2020, Stalwart Esports' PUBG Mobile division made their first appearance in PUBG Mobile Club Open (PMCO) Fall Split 2020 and claimed 3rd position, advancing to Season 2 of PUBG Mobile Pro League (PMPL) South Asia. However, in the wake of recent India-China disputes, PUBG Mobile was banned in India from 2 September. Reluctant to give up their slot, they signed a Pakistani line-up called FreeStyle Esports to represent them in the Pro League. FreeStyle Esports have been champions of the Pakistan PMCO 2020 and were part of the World League last season.

In December 2020, Stalwart Esports cross border collaboration with FreeStyle Esports continued and resulted in the formation of a new organisation called Stalwart Freestyle in Pakistan.

In February 2021, Stalwart Esports announced their second partnership in Pakistan with another Pakistani esports organisation 'Flex Esports' and formed a new entity Stalwart Flex in the region for the PMCO Pakistan 2021 Spring Split tournament.

In September 2021, Stalwart Esports revealed that it had acquired a Mongolian roster that won the PUBG Mobile Pro League (PMPL) South Asia Championship the previous June, which had a huge prize pool of $200,000. Stalwart Esports stated that the acquisition of this team has made them the highest-paid PUBG Mobile Esports athletes in the entire South Asian region.

In December 2021, Stalwart Esports qualified for the PUBG Mobile Global Championship 2021 (PMGC) Grand Finals which was held in Singapore & carried a massive prize pool of 6 Million USD, PMGC 2021 was the largest event in PUBG Mobile Esports history. It is the S Tier Event  
IP of PUBG Mobile Esports which is held once every year. Stalwart Esports ended as 2nd runners up in the PMGC League Stage.

Roster

Garena Free Fire 
On 1 October 2020, Stalwart Esports introduced their Free Fire Competitive line-up, participating in the Free Fire India Championship 2020 (FFIC). Stalwart finished in 2nd position during the league stages, and finished 3rd in the final, behind Total Gaming Esports and Esports Elite.

References 

2020 establishments in India
Esports teams established in 2020
Esports teams based in India
PlayerUnknown's Battlegrounds teams